Norman Frank Paul Butler (December 2, 1918 – October 8, 2011) was an American polo player and thoroughbred breeder.

Thoroughbred racing 

In 1960 he bought Kilboy Estate in County Tipperary, Ireland. As a thoroughbred breeder in 1972 he won the classic Irish 1,000 Guineas and the Irish St. Leger as well as the Pretty Polly Stakes with his famous horse Pidget, trained by Kevin Prendergast and ridden by the jockey T. P. Burns.

Biography 
	
Norman Frank Paul Butler was born to Paul Butler  and Sarah Anne Josephine (née Rooney), from County Mayo, Ireland. Both his father and his grandfather, Frank Osgood Butler, were prominent American industrialists and founders of Oak Brook Village, Illinois. He was born in New York City in 1918. He attended Hodder preparatory school, Downside and Stonyhurst College in Lancashire, England. He later studied Modern Greats at Oriel College, Oxford University.
	
	
In 1948 he married Pauline Winn, daughter of Lady Baillie and the Hon. Charles John Frederick Winn (son of Rowland Winn, 2nd Baron St Oswald), of Leeds Castle in Kent. They had two children together, Sandra Butler (born 1949) and Paget Butler (born 1953). They divorced in 1958.
	
	
From 1948 until 1960 he worked as a director in the Butler Paper and Butler Aviation companies, and Butler S.A. (South America).
	
	
It was also during this time that he played polo in the United States, England and South America.
	
	
In 1959 he married his second wife, the Hon. Penelope Dewar, daughter of Lord Forteviot, owner of Dewar Whiskies in Scotland. They had three children together, Paul Butler (born 1960), Tiggy Butler (born 1961) and Sean Butler (born 1963). They divorced in 1977.

In 1981 he married his third wife Baroness Gabriella Gröger von Sontag, fashion editor of German Vogue, daughter of a German banker and Director of the Dresdner Bank. They had one son, Patrick de Butler (born 1986).

References 

1918 births
2011 deaths
American polo players
American racehorse owners and breeders
American people of Irish descent